
Elodia may refer to:

People
Elodia Kāne, Hawaiian musician with Raymond Kāne
Disappearance and alleged murder of Elodia Ghinescu

Biology
 Elodea, a genus of aquatic plants
Elodia (fly), a genus of flies in the family Tachinidae.
Elodia parafacialis, a Chinese fly
Eulima elodia, a species of sea snail

Music
Elodia di Herstall, an opera by Alessandro Curmi (1842)
Elodia (album), by German duo Lacrimosa

See also
 Alodia, a medieval Nubian kingdom in modern-day Sudan
 Alodia, saint and child martyr from Huesca (see Nunilo and Alodia)